Ludlow is an unincorporated rural hamlet in Harding County, South Dakota, United States. It is located on Federal Highway 85, approximately 21 miles north of Buffalo, the Harding County seat, and six miles south of the North Dakota border. Although not tracked by the Census Bureau, Ludlow has been assigned the ZIP code of 57755.

Heavily isolated, the town is located over 20 miles away from the nearest grocery store and gas station. The only business in operation is a bar, The Crooked Creek #1, is frequently visited by travelers to and from Sturgis. The town is home to a rural school, and there was also a church located just north of town that was razed, likely in the 1990s, then rebuilt in 2012. As of 2018, the population was estimated to be near 3. The community has the name of William Ludlow, an explorer.

References

Unincorporated communities in Harding County, South Dakota
Unincorporated communities in South Dakota